Louis Cole can refer to:
 Louis Cole (musician), American multi-instrumentalist and singer-songwriter, part of Knower
 Louis Cole (YouTuber), English-born film-maker and YouTube personality